The Polish Academy Award for Best European Film is an annual award given to the best European film of the year.

Winners and nominees

See also
 European Film Awards

References

External links
 Polish Film Awards: Official website 

Polish film awards
Awards established in 2005
Polish Academy Award